The Bandbox is a 1919 American silent mystery crime film directed by Roy William Neill and starring Doris Kenyon, Walter McEwen and Gretchen Hartman. It is based on the 1912 novel of the same title by Louis Joseph Vance. Location shooting took place in Central Park and on Lake Mohegan in New York State.

Plot
A pearl necklace is smuggled through customs without paying duty after arriving in America from an ocean liner and a gang of criminals hot on the trail of them.

Cast
 Doris Kenyon as Eleanor Searle
 Walter McEwen as 	Arbuthnot Ismay / William H. Iff
 Gretchen Hartman as 	Alison Landis
 Edward Keppler as 	Arthur Arkroyd
 Maggie Weston as 	Mrs. Clover
 Logan Paul as 	Ehraim Clover
 Lorraine Harding as 	Marie
 Alexander Gaden as 	Benjamin Staff

References

Bibliography
 Connelly, Robert B. The Silents: Silent Feature Films, 1910–36, Volume 40, Issue 2. December Press, 1998.
 Munden, Kenneth White. The American Film Institute Catalog of Motion Pictures Produced in the United States, Part 1. University of California Press, 1997.

External links
 

1919 films
1919 mystery films
American silent feature films
American mystery films
Films directed by Roy William Neill
American black-and-white films
Films distributed by W. W. Hodkinson Corporation
Pathé Exchange films
Films based on American novels
1910s English-language films
1910s American films
Silent mystery films